CK Life Sciences International (Holdings) Inc., or CK Life Sciences, is a subsidiary of CK Hutchison Holdings. It is engaged in research and development, commercialization, marketing and sale of biotechnology products. The chairman is Mr. Victor Li, the elder son of Mr. Li Ka-shing, the chairman of Cheung Kong Holdings.

It was established in 2000 and listed on the Hong Kong Stock Exchange via Growth Enterprise Market in 2002. It was transferred to Main Board of the Hong Kong Stock Exchange in 2008.

CK Life Sciences has operations in Australia, and in 2012 acquired an Australian salt company (Cheetham Salt) as part of its expansion into the agricultural sector.

References

External links
CK Life Sciences International (Holdings) Inc.

Companies established in 2000
CK Hutchison Holdings
Biotechnology companies of Hong Kong
Companies listed on the Hong Kong Stock Exchange
Hong Kong brands